SP-85  is a state highway in the state of São Paulo in Brazil. 

Highways in São Paulo (state)

pt:SP-85